Honda Miyakoda Soccer Stadium is a stadium located in Kita-ku, Hamamatsu. It is owned by the Honda Motor Company and is the home ground of Honda F.C. in the Japan Football League. The stadium has a capacity for 2,506 spectators.

References

 

Football venues in Japan
Honda FC
Buildings and structures in Hamamatsu